Saroj Chooramani Gopal, is an Indian medical doctor, medical educationist and considered as the first woman M.ch paediatric surgeon from All India Institute of Medical Sciences, New Delhi in the country. She is currently the President, National Academy of Medical Sciences (India). She was honoured by the Government of India, in 2013, by bestowing on her the Padma Shri, the fourth highest civilian award, for her contributions to the fields of medicine and medical education.

Biography

Saroj Chooramani Gopal was born on 25 July 1944, in the pilgrim city of Mathura, Uttar Pradesh, India. After schooling, she chose a career in medicine, graduated from the Sarojini Naidu Medical College, Agra in 1966 and did MS at the same college, in 1969. This was followed by securing MCh in paediatric surgery from the All India Institute of Medical Sciences, New Delhi, in 1973, the first woman to obtain a degree in paediatric surgery in India.

Saroj Gopal's career started by joining the faculty of the Institute of Medical Sciences, Banaras Hindu University in 1973 where she worked till her retirement in 2008 as the Medical Superintendent of the medical college hospital and as the Dean of the Faculty of Medicine. That year, she was selected as the Vice Chancellor of the King George's Medical University (KGMU), Lucknow, becoming the first woman to head the university which for a while during the reign of Mayawati, was under the name, the Chhatrapati Shahuji Maharaj Medical University. She retired from the university in 2011.

Legacy
Saroj Chooramani Gopal is reported to have pioneered several techniques in paediatric surgery and is known for the developmental efforts put in by her during her tenure with KGMU, besides the many research articles she has published.

Scientific and administrative contributions
Gopal is credited with many low cost innovations intended to benefit the financially compromised people. The National Research Development Corporation, (NRDC) New Delhi have issued patents for six of those innovations to Saroj Gopal. She has also been reported to have invented new surgical techniques and she has published the details of three of such techniques. She helped establish a well equipped Department of Child and New Born Surgery at the Institute of Medical Sciences during her tenure at the institute. She has also organized many international symposia in paediatric surgery, has delivered key note addresses at a few of them and has participated in many social campaigns.

Publications
Gopal has published several articles, counted at 120, in peer reviewed national and international journals. Some of her articles on hemangioma and teratoma have provided valuable insights on the treatment of the disease.

Positions
Saroj Gopal holds the position of the honorary Professor of the Centre of Biomedical Research. She was the President of the Indian Association of Pediatric Surgeons, in 1998, of which she is currently a member. She has been a member of the Expert Panel of the National Academy of Medical Sciences, New Delhi, an examiner with many universities and an inspector of the University Grants Commission. Currently she is the President of the National Academy of Medical Sciences, New Delhi 

She is also a member of professional bodies like the Association of Surgeons of India, the Indian Medical Association and the Indian Academy of Medical Sciences.

Awards and recognitions
Saroj Gopal is a recipient of many honours such as:
 Commonwealth Medical Scholarship, 1984
 Senior Commonwealth Medical Scholarship, 1994
 INSA Senior Fellowship - Indian National Science Academy - 1994
 Indo German Fellowship - 1997
 Indo Finnish Fellowship - 1994
 University Grants Commission Fellowship
 National Academy of Medical Sciences Fellowship
The Government of India conferred the Dr. B. C. Roy Award on Gopal in 2002, and followed it up with the civilian award of the Padma Shri, in 2013.  She has also received the President's Medal in 1966, Shushila Nair Shield for excellence in studies, Dr Mridula Rohtagi Oration Award of the Association of Pediatric Surgeons of India in 2005, Col. Sangam Lal Oration Award of Indian National Medical Academy in 2007.

See also
 King George's Medical University
 Institute of Medical Sciences

References

External links
 
 
 
 

1944 births
Living people
Recipients of the Padma Shri in medicine
20th-century Indian medical doctors
Indian medical writers
Indian medical academics
Scientists from Varanasi
Indian surgeons
Dr. B. C. Roy Award winners
Fellows of the National Academy of Medical Sciences
Fellows of the Indian National Science Academy
20th-century Indian inventors
Academic staff of Banaras Hindu University
All India Institute of Medical Sciences, New Delhi alumni
Sarojini Naidu Medical College alumni
Dr. Bhimrao Ambedkar University alumni
Heads of universities and colleges in India
Indian women science writers
Indian women surgeons
20th-century Indian educational theorists
Indian women educational theorists
Women scientists from Uttar Pradesh
20th-century Indian women scientists
21st-century Indian women scientists
21st-century Indian medical doctors
Indian scientific authors
21st-century Indian educational theorists
Medical doctors from Uttar Pradesh
Women educators from Uttar Pradesh
Educators from Uttar Pradesh
20th-century women physicians
21st-century women physicians
Indian paediatric surgeons
20th-century women educators
21st-century women educators